Josée Castonguay is a Canadian costume designer in film and television. She is most noted for her work on the films Barefoot at Dawn (Pieds nus dans l'aube), for which she was a Prix Iris nominee for Best Costume Design at the 20th Quebec Cinema Awards in 2018, and The Time Thief (L'Arracheuse de temps), for which she was a Canadian Screen Award nominee for Best Costume Design at the 10th Canadian Screen Awards in 2022.

She has also been a frequent Gémeaux Award nominee for her work in television, winning in 2009 for Les Hauts et les bas de Sophie Paquin.

References

External links

Canadian costume designers
Canadian women artists
Living people
Year of birth missing (living people)